Onotokiba is a genus of ground beetles in the family Carabidae. There are about six described species in Onotokiba.

Species
These six species belong to the genus Onotokiba:
 Onotokiba guineensis Basilewsky, 1951  (Guinea and Sierra Leone)
 Onotokiba katangana Basilewsky, 1953  (Democratic Republic of the Congo)
 Onotokiba lomaensis Lecordier, 1966  (Sierra Leone)
 Onotokiba orbithorax Alluaud, 1926  (worldwide)
 Onotokiba ruandana Basilewsky, 1956  (Burundi, Democratic Republic of the Congo, and Rwanda)
 Onotokiba uluguruana Basilewsky, 1962  (Tanzania)

References

Platyninae